The 2022–23 Hellenic Football League season is the 70th in the history of the Hellenic Football League, a football competition in England. The league operates two divisions, the Premier Division at Step 5 and Division One at Step 6.

The allocations for Steps 5 and 6 this season were announced by The Football Association on 12 May 2022.

Premier Division

Team changes

To the Premier Division
Promoted from Division One
Hereford Pegasus
Worcester Raiders

Relegated from the Southern League Division One Central
Wantage Town

Relegated from the Southern League Division One South
Mangotsfield United

From the Premier Division
Promoted to the Southern League Premier Division South
Bishop's Cleeve
Westbury United

Relegated to Division One
Calne Town

Relegated to the Western League Division One
Hallen

Premier Division table

Stadiums and locations

Division One

Team changes

To Division One
Promoted from the Herefordshire FA County League
Hartpury University

Promoted from the Oxfordshire Senior League
Southam United

Relegated from the Premier Division
Calne Town

Transferred from the Spartan South Midlands League Division One
Kidlington Reserves
Long Crendon

From Division One
Promoted to the Premier Division
Hereford Pegasus
Worcester Raiders

Promoted to the Midland League Premier Division
Studley

Division One table

Stadiums and locations

References

External links
 Official Site

2022–23
9